Khaled Ahmed Musa (born 23 November 1972) is a Sudanese athlete. He competed in the men's long jump at the 1992 Summer Olympics.

References

1972 births
Living people
Athletes (track and field) at the 1992 Summer Olympics
Sudanese male long jumpers
Olympic athletes of Sudan
Place of birth missing (living people)